Sydney Regan was an English football manager who led French team Sète to the 1930 Coupe de France title.

References

English footballers
English football managers
FC Sète 34 managers
Year of birth missing
Year of death missing
Association footballers not categorized by position